Jean-Paul Gauzès (born 1 October 1947 in Toulouse) is a French politician of the Union for a Popular Movement, part of the European People's Party. He served as a Member of the European Parliament for the North-West of France from 2004 to 2014.

Early career
After studying economics and law and lecturing in Toulouse, Gauzès moved to Paris in 1972, working in the Ministry of National Education before moving into legal practice. From 1980 until 1994, he worked as a lawyer in the Council of State and in the Court of Appeals.

In 1996, Gauzès was involved in the creation of Dexia. Between 1998 and 2007, he served as the company's director on legal and tax matters in France and worked for Dexia Credit Local, a subsidiary of the bank that lends money to local governments.

Political career

Role in national politics
In the 1998 French regional elections, Gauzès was one of five mainstream center-right politicians who, having accepted votes from the far-right National Front, were voted into office as regional presidents. This sparked an uproar among their political allies, prompting Gauzès to resign.

Member of the European Parliament
Gauzès was first elected Member of the European Parliament in the 2004 European elections. For the 2014 elections, he was placed third on the list of UMP candidates in the North-West constituency; he was not re-elected.

Throughout his time in parliament, Gauzès served on the Committee on Economic and Monetary Affairs. In this capacity, he was appointed rapporteur for the Payment Services Directive in 2006 and for the directive on credit rating agencies in 2008. He was a leading negotiator on the Alternative Investment Fund Managers Directive in 2011 and during the talks on new budget-monitoring regulations following the eurozone crisis.

In addition to his committee assignments, Gauzès was a member of the Parliament's delegation with Iran (2004-2009), the countries of south-east Europe (2007-2009) and the Korean Peninsula (2009-2014),

European Financial Reporting Advisory Group (EFRAG)
In 2016, the European Commission proposed Gauzès for the role of President of the European Financial Reporting Advisory Group (EFRAG). Following a hearing, the Committee on Economic and Monetary Affairs confirmed Gauzès’ nomination in May 2016.

Political positions
In 2009, Gauzès and Pervenche Berès publicly protested against the nomination of Sharon Bowles as chairwoman of the Committee on Economic and Monetary Affairs. They took issue with the idea of someone from a country that is not part of the eurozone chairing a committee that has, as one of its main responsibilities, regular hearings with the President of the European Central Bank. Under the resulting pressure, Bowles was forced to publicly state her support for the UK replacing the pound with the euro.

In 2011, Gauzès and Burkhard Balz said that a proposal by the Nasdaq OMX Group and Intercontinental Exchange (ICE) to buy NYSE Euronext "poses serious concerns" about the financial stability of the tech-heavy American exchange. Instead they supported the proposed combination of Deutsche Börse and NYSE Euronext, arguing that this would "create a strong and viable European actor with a global outreach and footprint."

References

External links
 Jean-Paul GAUZÈS. European Parliament. Accessed 2011-02-01.

1947 births
Living people
Knights of the Ordre national du Mérite
MEPs for North-West France 2004–2009
MEPs for North-West France 2009–2014
Union for a Popular Movement MEPs